The 2023 Sakhir FIA Formula 2 round was a motor racing event held between 3 and 5 March 2023 at the Bahrain International Circuit, Sakhir, Bahrain. It was the first race of the 2023 FIA Formula 2 Championship and was held in support of the 2023 Bahrain Grand Prix.

Background

Team changes 
German Formula 4 team PHM Racing took over the entry and assets of Charouz Racing System at the end of the 2022 season, and runs in cooperation with the Czech squad under the PHM Racing by Charouz moniker.

Driver changes 
As the category's sporting regulations state, reigning Drivers' Champion Felipe Drugovich was unable to defend the title and therefore left the series. This year's championship also saw the return of American driver Juan Manuel Correa, who returned to the series after his heavy accident at the 2019 Spa-Francorchamps Formula 2 round in which Anthoine Hubert lost his life.

Weekend report  
ART Grand Prix's Théo Pourchaire, who became vice-champion the previous season, already showed during Qualifying on Friday afternoon, that he was the man to beat in that year's championship as he took pole position by a significant margin of 0.751 seconds of teammate and fellow frenchman Victor Martins, who is also the reigning F3 drivers' champion. The Sauber Academy driver would go on to win the Feature Race in dominant fashion, winning nearly 20 seconds ahead of Ralph Boschung, who became a first-time F2 race winner after winning the Sprint Race the previous day, and rookie driver Zane Maloney, who finished third.

As the championship round concluded, Pourchaire led the standings with 32 points ahead of Boschung (28) and Maloney (15), as Campos Racing led the Teams' Championship for the first time in Formula 2, scoring a total of 42 points at this weekend. Reigning Teams' Champion MP Motorsport only managed to score 11 points throughout the weekend as both of its drivers, Dennis Hauger and Jehan Daruvala, failed to score any points in the Feature Race, finishing the weekend in 6th in the Teams' standings.

Classification

Qualifying 

Notes
  – Frederik Vesti has been handed a three-place grid drop for impeding Arthur Leclerc during Qualifying, demoting him to ninth place for Saturday's Sprint race.

Sprint race 

Notes
 – Richard Verschoor retired, but was classified as he completed over 90% of the race distance.

Feature Race

Standings after the event 

Drivers' Championship standings

Teams' Championship standings

 Note: Only the top five positions are included for both sets of standings.

See also 
 2023 Bahrain Grand Prix
 2023 Sakhir Formula 3 round

References

External links 

 Official website

Sakhir
Sakhir Formula 2
Sakhir Formula 2